Margaret Goodin Fritsch (November 3, 1899 – June 27, 1993) was an American architect. In 1923 she became the first female graduate of the University of Oregon School of Architecture and in 1926 she became the first licensed female architect in the state of Oregon. She went on to run her own architecture firm and eventually served as a city planner in Alaska.

Early life
Fritsch was born Margaret Goodin in 1899 in Salem, Oregon to Richard Bennet Goodin and Ella Emily Buck. After attending Willamette University for a year, she enrolled at the University of Oregon to study pre-med because her father believed that women were best suited to careers in nursing. At the university, Fritsch befriended students who were majoring in architecture, and decided to switch to the School of Architecture. She graduated in 1923, making her the first female graduate of the faculty.

Career
After her graduation, Fritsch completed three years of internship at the firms of Houghtaling and Dougan, Van Etten & Co. and Morris H. Whitehouse. She received her license to practice architecture professionally in 1926, becoming the first licensed female architect in Oregon, and her first commissioned project was the design of the Delta Delta Delta sorority house at the University of Oregon. The same year, she was elected secretary of Oregon's State Board of Architectural Examiners—becoming the first female to hold the position—and held the role until 1956.

Fritsch met her husband, Frederick Fritsch, a fellow architect, in 1925 and they married in 1928. They moved to Philadelphia and completed one collaboration, the Delta Delta Delta sorority house at the University of Pennsylvania in 1929. They returned to Portland, Oregon in 1930, where Margaret set up her own office three years later. Frederick had been diagnosed shortly after their marriage with an incurable disease, and committed suicide in 1934; Margaret adopted an 11-year-old daughter in 1935 to lessen her loneliness.

Fritsch was elected to the American Institute of Architects in 1935 and continued working for her firm until 1940, mainly designing residential houses. After the beginning of World War II, she gave up architecture due to the lack of work and took on a job at the Portland Housing Authority. She moved to Alaska in 1957 and became a city planner for Juneau and Douglas.

Later life
Fritsch retired in 1974 and died of pneumonia in Juneau in 1993. She is buried at River View Cemetery in Portland.

References

External links
Margaret G. Fritsch, interview by Linda S. Dobbs, March 29, 1982, interview no: 54368079, audiobook on cassette, worldcat.org, Auburn. 
“Fritsch, Margaret Goodin – BWAF Dynamic National Archive.” Accessed October 13, 2021. https://dna.bwaf.org/architect/fritsch-margaret-goodin.
American Architectural Foundation. "That Exceptional One": Women in American Architecture, 1888-1988. Washington, D.C.: American Architectural Foundation, 1988.

1899 births
1993 deaths
Architects from Portland, Oregon
Artists from Salem, Oregon
University of Oregon alumni
20th-century American architects
American women architects
Deaths from pneumonia in Alaska
20th-century American women